Atul Verma (born 20 June 1997 ) is an Indian archer . He won the bronze medal in Men's Recurve Archery at 2014 Summer Youth Olympics in Nanjing, China  beating Mete Gazoz of Turkey 6-4 .

Tokyo Olympics 
He secured his place compete in Tokyo Olympics in the November qualifiers.  Atul was included in the Target Olympic Podium Scheme (TOPS) list for the 2020 Olympics.

References 

Indian male archers
1997 births
Living people
Archers at the 2014 Summer Youth Olympics
Place of birth missing (living people)